efax is an integrated fax program for Unix-like computer systems, produced by Casas Communications Engineering since 1993.

The software allows users to send and receive faxes using a computer, fax modem, and telephone line. It is command-line based, but there are several graphical user interfaces available.

efax is open-source and free software, licensed under the GPL. It is included in several major Linux distributions, including Debian, Red Hat, Mandriva, and others. There is also a BSD version, and it forms part of the Apple Mac OS X Darwin system.

References

External links
efax website
efax setup tutorial
efax Linux manpage
FSF directory page
efax enhancement patches
Efax-gtk The leading graphical front-end for efax

Fax software
Unix software